Niharika Singh is an Indian film actress and producer. She began her career as a model and won the title of Miss Earth India in 2005. As an actor, she made her debut with the critically acclaimed drama Miss Lovely which competed in Un Certain Regard at the 2012 Cannes Film Festival. Niharika was selected for Berlinale Talents in 2016.

Early life 
Niharika spent her childhood in various north Indian towns and hill stations, moving homes and schools every few years. Singh was an avid reader growing up and showed a keen interest in drama and creative writing. She recalls her first performance as Bharat Mata at the age of 4 in her elementary school in Haridwar. She would attend children theatre workshops conducted by Sahitya Kala Parishad in New Delhi where her maternal family lived and performed in plays in her summer vacations. Niharika was then sent to an all girls boarding school, All Saints' College in Nainital where her interests in co-curricular activities were encouraged.

Career

Modeling & pageantry (1999–2006) 
Singh started working as a model in 1999 when she first walked the ramp for a design institute in Dehradun. She went on to pursue a degree in B.Com. (Hons) at Shri Ram College of Commerce in New Delhi and continued taking modelling assignments alongside to earn a little income. Niharika featured in several print campaigns, fashion magazines, music videos and decided to drop out of college and move to Mumbai to pursue a full time career in the entertainment business in 2003.

Singh participated in Femina Miss India in 2005 and finished third, winning the title of Miss Earth India along with subtitles for Miss Photogenic and Miss Beautiful Hair. She went on to represent India at Miss Earth 2005 held in the Philippines,appeared in several television commercials and ad campaigns for various brands across the country and hosted a reality TV series Banungi Main Miss India with the Femina Miss India contestants of 2006. Singh featured in Times of India's 2005 list of Most Desirable Women and continued her modelling career until she began getting offers to act in Bollywood films.

Acting in film (2006–present) 
Niharika's film career began in 2006 when she signed a 10-film contract with Bollywood director Raj Kanwar under his banner Inderjit Films. The films were never made and she remained locked in the contract until singer Himesh Reshammiya approached her to play the role of a haughty heiress opposite him in A New Love Ishtory to be produced by T-Series (company) and directed by John Matthew Matthan. Niharika attended an acting course with Barry John (theatre director) before filming A New Love Ishtory. Due to internal differences during the making of the film, producer Bhushan Kumar pulled the finance, dubbed the unfinished version and sold the film directly to a television channel without the knowledge of the cast and crew. Singh started shooting for her second film Mudh Mudh Ke Na Dekh Mudh Mudh Ke opposite Reshammiya which was shelved mid-way. She also acted in a Kannada film Private Number directed by Anand Kumar (director) that never found a release.

After a series of shelved and unreleased films, Singh made her debut with Ashim Ahluwalia's critically acclaimed first feature Miss Lovely, set in the criminal depths of Mumbai's C-grade sex-horror film industry. The film competed in Un Certain Regard at the 2012 Cannes Film Festival and won 2 awards at the 61st National Film Awards. Singh played a mysterious ingénue with a shadowy past, for which she earned rave reviews for her performance and a nomination for the most promising newcomer at the 21st Screen Awards. During the media interactions for Miss Lovely, Niharika mentioned she is attempting to write a memoir.

Niharika rediscovered cinema after her experience with Cannes and other international festivals and she joined a course at the Film and Television Institute of India in 2013 to expand her understanding of the medium. The actress was selected for Berlinale Talents in 2016 where she was introduced to Alexander Technique while attending a workshop with Jean-Louis Rodrigue and Kristof Konrad.

Singh took a break from public life and made rare appearances in a few independent/art house film projects over the next decade. She was seen in Buddhadeb Dasgupta's Hindi feature Anwar Ka Ajab Kissa that premiered at BFI London Film Festival,Bappaditya Bandopadhyay's multi-lingual drama Sohra Bridge, which screened at the 46th International Film Festival of India, Nikhil Pherwani's directorial debut Ahaan, the first Hindi language film to cast an actor with down syndrome in the lead and Ashim Ahluwalia's Indian segment "Palace of horrors" in the feature length horror anthology The Field Guide to Evil which had its world premiere at South by Southwest. She actively chose to keep a low profile in the media and refused to participate in promotional activities for any film during this period.

Entrepreneurship & production (2019 - present) 
In 2019, Singh joined Mumbai-based Future East as a director of the film production company. She co-founded Future East Digital with filmmaker Ashim Ahluwalia and visual artist Amit Basak in 2020. 

Niharika was a producer on the young-adult drama Class (season 1) for Netflix in 2023. The series explores a wide range of social issues affecting modern youth including casteism, child neglect, corruption, homophobia, religious discrimination, and income inequality in India.

In media 

Singh was given a rousing welcome and declared the state guest in Uttarakhand by Chief Minister Narayan Dutt Tiwari after she was crowned Miss Earth India. She was appointed the goodwill ambassador for Rotary Blood Bank in 2005 at the behest of the Governor of Uttarakhand Sudarshan Agarwal and a garden was named after her in Mussoorie.

In 2007, a model from Benaras shot to fame by walking down the ramp impersonating Niharika Singh.

Niharika issued a public statement in 2017 when her name was used to garner publicity to sell actor Nawazuddin Siddiqui's memoir An Ordinary Life written by Rituparna Chatterjee and published by Penguin Random House with a fabricated account of their relationship. After a severe backlash and a defamation case by another actress Sunita Rajwar, Nawazuddin Siddiqui issued an apology and withdrew the book within a fortnight after its release. Veteran actress Asha Parekh showed her displeasure and said, "What Nawazuddin did to the ladies was not in good taste." In a later interview, Siddiqui stated that "It was the biggest mistake of my life."

In November 2018, Singh wrote an essay addressing the Me Too movement as a dalit woman in the entertainment business which was posted by journalist Sandhya Menon on Twitter. The piece went viral and was immediately picked up by all leading media publications and news channels in India.

Niharika has been invited as a guest and speaker on panels in Harvard University, Columbia University, The New School and Jawaharlal Nehru University.

Filmography

Films

Web series

Awards and nominations

References

External links 
 
 

Femina Miss India winners
Female models from Uttarakhand
Miss Earth 2005 contestants
Miss Earth India delegates
Living people
Year of birth missing (living people)
Actresses in Hindi cinema
Indian film actresses
Actresses from Dehradun
21st-century Indian actresses
Place of birth missing (living people)